Il Cambise is an opera by Alessandro Scarlatti to a libretto by Domenico Lalli. It was first performed on 4 February 1719 at the Teatro San Bartolomeo in Naples. It was the composer's 111th opera and his last for Naples.

Selected recordings
Sinfonia "doppo che sia alzata la tenda", Arias "Io parto vincitor". "In quelle luci belle" "Mi cinga la fama" Daniela Barcellona (mezzo) Concerto de Cavalieri, Marcello Di Lisa DHM
"Tutto appoggio il mio disegno" Max Cencic Il Pomo D'Oro, Maxim Emelyanychev Decca 2015
"Quando vedrai", "Mi cinga la fama" Carlo Vistoli (countertenor) I Talenti Vulcanici, Stefano Demicheli. Arcana 2017

References

External links

Operas
1719 operas
Operas by Alessandro Scarlatti
Italian-language operas